A by-election was held for the New South Wales Legislative Assembly electorate of Wollombi on 19 September 1870 because Joseph Eckford was insolvent.

Dates

Result

Joseph Eckford was insolvent.

See also
Electoral results for the district of Wollombi
List of New South Wales state by-elections

References

1870 elections in Australia
New South Wales state by-elections
1870s in New South Wales